Anthony Watmough (born 10 July 1983) is an Australian former professional rugby league footballer. An Australian international and New South Wales State of Origin representative forward, he played the majority of his career with the Manly-Warringah Sea Eagles, winning both the 2008 NRL Premiership and the 2011 NRL Premiership with them.

Playing career

2000s
A product of the Narrabeen Sharks, Watmough first played in the NRL in 2002 for the Northern Eagles club. In 2005, Watmough was first selected for the New South Wales State of Origin team. Watmough was awarded the 2007 Dally M Second Rower of the Year award. He played in the 2007 NRL grand final defeat by the Melbourne Storm. He played in the 2008 NRL Grand Final victory over the Melbourne Storm and was then named in the Australian squad for the 2008 Rugby League World Cup. 

After being involved in an alleged incident where Watmough abused a club sponsors 21-year-old daughter and then punched the sponsor at the club's 2009 season launch, Watmough started the following season in good form, winning the man-of-the-match award for his two-try performance in Manly's victory in the 2009 World Club Challenge. He was selected for Australia in the one-off test match against New Zealand on 8 May 2009.

Watmough gave a dominant display to earn the man of the match award in game 3 of the 2009 State of Origin series in what was described by commentator Andrew Voss as one of the greatest ever Origin performances. He won his second Dally M Second-Rower of The Year award for the 2009 season and in doing so made sure Manly retained the award for the third year in a row as his teammate Glenn Stewart won it the year before and Watmough won it in 2007. In the 3-year period from the start of 2008 season, Watmough was penalised in games 70 times, the most of any player in the NRL. To add, he had recently been caught urinating on a shopfront which caused a fan fume uproar.

2010s
For the 2010 ANZAC Test, Watmough was selected to play for Australia from the interchange bench in their victory against New Zealand. 2011 was seen as a turnaround for Anthony Watmough both on and off the field. Off-field, Manly coach Des Hasler enlisted the help of his 1987 and 1996 premiership coach, Rugby League Immortal and club legend Bob Fulton whose private talk with Watmough put the 27-year-old back on the straight and narrow while his on-field form for the second placed Manly club saw him return to the NSW Origin team for games 2 and 3 of the 2011 State of Origin series.

However, before the end of the season, reports emerged of another off-field transgression, with Watmough accused of trashing a hotel room after a State of Origin victory.

In the 2012 State of Origin series Watmough was the only New South Wales player who had ever experienced a series victory. Watmough was selected for Australia in the 2013 ANZAC Test and played from the interchange bench. In what was the first test match ever played in Canberra, New Zealand were defeated.

On 28 October 2014, after a couple months of speculation of Watmough making a move to the Parramatta Eels, he was released from Manly-Warringah to sign a four-year deal with the Eels starting from the 2015 NRL season.

Following his first full season with the Parramatta club in 2015, with some time off the field due to injury, Watmough entered the 2016 NRL season with the club aiming for a premiership. It was early in the 2016 NRL season that he suffered a recurring knee injury which saw him sidelined once again.

It was also early into 2016 which saw the club entangled in salary-cap related controversy, and following a lengthy investigation, the NRL deemed Parramatta to be non-compliant with the salary cap - the club was docked 12 competition points, and ordered to become compliant to be able to play for competition points over the remainder of the season.

This led to the club needing to move players on, and with Watmough having been rumored to be looking to retire due to injury earlier on in the season, this was something the club would want to make use of to become compliant.

It was on May 12, 2016 that Watmough's medical retirement was given the green light by the NRL.

Post playing
On 13 June 2018, Watmough unleashed an extraordinary tirade against Manly captain Daly Cherry-Evans, accusing him of holding Manly back over his financial demands. Watmough claimed that Cherry-Evans had turned into a "fuckwit" after the halfback's first season with the club in 2011, when they won the NRL premiership. Watmough said, "He just signed a four-year deal and he didn’t turn up to training. He said his manager told him not to. His idiot manager signed him for five years on no money because nobody thought he was good. In the end, [coach] Geoff Toovey succumbed to the board and [Cherry-Evans] was put on $500,000 after being on $50,000. Toovey chose the board and one player over the rest of the players and that’s where he lost me".

References

External links
NRL profile
Anthony Watmough at Manly Sea Eagles

1983 births
Living people
Australian rugby league players
Australia national rugby league team players
Manly Warringah Sea Eagles players
Northern Eagles players
Parramatta Eels players
New South Wales City Origin rugby league team players
New South Wales Rugby League State of Origin players
NRL All Stars players
Rugby league second-rows
Rugby league locks
Rugby league players from New South Wales